This list of American atheists includes atheists born in, became citizens of, or lived in the United States. This list is arranged by surname.

A

B

C

D

E

F

G

H

J

K

L

M

N

O

P

R

S

T

U

V

W

Y

Z

See also
Atheism in the United States

References

Atheists
Americans